Ivaylo Borislavov Markov (born 5 June 1997) is a Bulgarian professional footballer who currently plays as a defender for Podbeskidzie Bielsko-Biała.

Career
Markov started his career at the youth ranks of Slavia Sofia. On 1 February 2016, he was loaned to Slivnishki Geroy in the South-West V AFG league.

On 24 July, Markov signed a 3-year contract with Lokomotiv Plovdiv. On 11 January 2017, he was loaned to Tsarsko Selo until the end of the season. On 25 February, he made his professional debut in the Second League, playing full 90 minutes in a 1–2 away defeat by Vitosha Bistritsa.

On 14 July 2017, Markov made his First League debut for Lokomotiv Plovdiv in a 2–1 away win over Etar.

In June 2018, Markov signed with Cherno More.  As he faced serious competition from Daniel Dimov, Plamen Dimov, Ilias Hassani and Miroslav Enchev, on 25 July the club loaned him to Tsarsko Selo.

On 16 July 2021, Markov signed for Israeli Premier League club Hapoel Hadera.

On 16 June 2022, he moved to Poland, signing a two-year deal with I liga side Podbeskidzie Bielsko-Biała.

References

External links

1997 births
Living people
Footballers from Sofia
Bulgarian footballers
PFC Slavia Sofia players
PFC Lokomotiv Plovdiv players
FC Tsarsko Selo Sofia players
FC Dunav Ruse players
PFC Cherno More Varna players
Hapoel Hadera F.C. players
Podbeskidzie Bielsko-Biała players
First Professional Football League (Bulgaria) players
Second Professional Football League (Bulgaria) players
Association football central defenders
Expatriate footballers in Israel
Bulgarian expatriate sportspeople in Israel
Expatriate footballers in Poland
Bulgarian expatriate sportspeople in Poland